Heimo Taskinen (born 25 February 1947 in Varpaisjärvi) is a Finnish ski-orienteering competitor and world champion. He won a gold medal at the first World Ski Orienteering Championships in Hyvinkää in 1975 in the relay event with the Finnish team (with Pekka Pökälä, Jorma Karvonen and Olavi Svanberg). He also received an individual bronze medal in 1975.

See also
 Finnish orienteers
 List of orienteers
 List of orienteering events

References

1947 births
Living people
People from Lapinlahti
Finnish orienteers
Male orienteers
Ski-orienteers
Sportspeople from North Savo